The John Curtin School of Medical Research (JCSMR) is an Australian multidisciplinary translational medical research institute and postgraduate education centre that forms part of the Australian National University (ANU) in Canberra. The school was founded in 1948 as a result of the vision of Nobel Laureate Sir Howard Florey and was named in honour of Australia's World War II Prime Minister John Curtin, who had died in office a few years earlier.

In addition to Florey, Sir John Eccles  (1963), Peter Doherty  and Rolf M. Zinkernagel  (1996), were Nobel Laureates as a result of research conducted at the JCSMR. Other notable researchers include Gordon Ada , Frank Fenner , Sir Hugh Ennor , David Roderick Curtis  and Chris Goodnow .

The Director of the School is Professor Graham Mann. The JCSMR comprises three divisions: the Division of Immunity, Inflammation and Infection, the Division of Genome Sciences and Cancer, and the Eccles Institute of Neuroscience.

Research focus
Doherty's research discovered the way T cells interact with the Major Histocompatibility Complex in antigen recognition. Eccles was the Foundation Professor of Physiology at JCSMR when he received the Nobel Prize in 1963 for his study of nerve cells. Since 2012, the Eccles Institute of Neuroscience has been located in a new 60 million wing of JCSMR. The main research areas of the Eccles Institute of Neuroscience are cellular and synaptic physiology, sensory physiology and retina and muscle.

Research in the Genome Sciences and Cancer Division combines advanced experimental and computational approaches with sophisticated genetic models to connect genotype with phenotype, understand mechanisms of cell differentiation, development or pathology, and generate novel therapies for cancer and other disease.

The Division of Immunity, Inflammation and Infection focuses on mechanisms of immune-mediated pathology, mechanisms of immunity to infection, the longevity of immunity and immunological memory, and immunodeficiency syndromes, and mechanisms of leukocyte differentiation, trafficking, and growth control that are pertinent to cancer, immunological tolerance, autoimmunity, allergy and immunodeficiency.

JCSMR facilities
Completed as three buildings in stages over seven years by Hindmarsh Construction Australia at a cost of 130 million, the design of the building is influenced by the DNA double helix and provides education, conference, and secure research laboratory facilities. Parts of the School were filmed during the making of the drama series, The Code, broadcast on ABC TV during 2014 and 2016.

On 28 August 2006, the new ACRF Biomolecular Resource Facility was officially opened within the JCSMR, a new facility focusing on investigating the molecular aspects of cancer biology. The facility was partially supported by a 1.13 million grant awarded in 2004 by the Australian Cancer Research Foundation. 

Major action star Jackie Chan made donations to the School, with the Director in 2006 announcing the Jackie Chan Science Centre was named in his honour; and was opened by Chan in 2008.

See also

Health in Australia

References

Further reading

External links
John Curtin School of Medical Research

Australian National University
Medical research institutes in the Australian Capital Territory
1948 establishments in Australia
Research institutes established in 1948